is a Japanese talent agency headquartered in Shibuya, Tokyo. It was founded in 1997 and focuses on talent management for actors, musicians, announcers, content creators and tarento. Cube also provides music, theater and other entertainment production services. The company also operates in Osaka as another agency called .

In January 2020, one of the agency's talents, Ikimono-gakari's guitarist, Yamashita was reported by entertainment tabloid magazine Friday for non-consensual advances on a woman. The president of Cube, Hiryoyuki Kitamaki made a statement regarding the news, declining all accusations made by the entertainment tabloid magazine as non factual.

Notable talents

Male

Under Cube Inc. 

 Kenji Ebisawa
 Ken'ya Ōsumi
 Ryō Katō
 Ryuji Kamiyama
 Yūji Kishi
 Nobuo Kyo
 Ryosei Konishi
 Kong Kuwata
 Satoshi Hashimoto
 Naohito Fujiki
 Kunio Murai
 Kentarō Ōtani

Under Ricomotion inc. 

 Katsuhisa Namase
 Arata Furuta
 Atsushi Yamanishi

Female

Under Cube Inc. 

 Noriko Nakagoshi
 First Summer Uika

Under Ricomotion inc. 

 Akoya Sogi

Musicians 

 Junna
 Tokyo Performance Doll
 The Mass Missile
 ManaKana

Former talents 
 Ikimono-gakari

References

External links 

 Cube Official website
 Ricomotion Official website

Mass media companies established in 1997
Entertainment companies of Japan
Talent agencies based in Tokyo
Mass media companies based in Tokyo
Japanese companies established in 1997
Japanese talent agencies